The 1974–75 All-Ireland Senior Club Football Championship was the fifth staging of the All-Ireland Senior Club Football Championship since its establishment by the Gaelic Athletic Association in 1970-71.

University College Dublin were the defending champions.

On 16 March 1975, University College Dublin won the championship following a 1-11 to 0-12 defeat of Nemo Rangers in the All-Ireland final at Croke Park. It was their second championship title overall and their second title in succession.

Results

Munster Senior Club Football Championship

First round

Semi-finals

Final

All-Ireland Senior Club Football Championship

Semi-finals

Final

Championship statistics

Miscellaneous

 Clan na Gael became the first team to three successive Ulster Club Championship titles.
 University College Dublin became the first team to win back-to-back Leinster Club Championship titles.
 Roscommon Gaels won the Connacht Club Championship title for the first time in their history.

References

1974 in Gaelic football
1975 in Gaelic football